Alta Vista is an unincorporated community in Daviess and DeKalb counties, in the U.S. state of Missouri.

The community sits on a ridge above and east of Grindstone Creek. Missouri Route 6 passes through the location. Weatherby is two miles to the west along route 6.

History
Alto Vista was laid out in 1865, and named for its lofty elevation. A post office called Alta Vista was established in 1865, and remained in operation until 1905.

References

Unincorporated communities in Daviess County, Missouri
Unincorporated communities in DeKalb County, Missouri
Unincorporated communities in Missouri